The Australian Renewable Energy Agency (ARENA) is an independent agency of the Australian federal government, established in 2012 to manage Australia's renewable energy programs, with the objective of increasing supply and competitiveness of Australian renewable energy sources.

Background 
ARENA was established in 2012 as an independent statutory authority to manage the government's renewable energy programs. Legal establishment came with the passing of the Australian Renewable Energy Agency Act 2011 (ARENA Act). The legislation passed parliament in November 2011 with the support of the Australian Greens and the Liberal and National coalition opposition as well as the governing Labor Party. ARENA commenced operations on 1 July 2012. The agency resulted from negotiations within the Australian parliament under the Gillard Government, with the intention of providing more secure funding for renewable energy programs in the context of political changes.

While ARENA was created as part of the Clean Energy Future package together with the Clean Energy Finance Corporation, these are separate institutions. ARENA has consolidated various earlier renewable programs and research and development projects from the Australian Centre for Renewable Energy, the Australian Solar Institute and the former Department of Resources, Energy and Tourism.

Responsibilities 
ARENA was established with a total funding allocation of $3.2 billion out to 2020. In the 2013 budget the Labor government deferred $370 million of the agency's funding, extending the timeline to 2022. The subsequent Abbott Government proposed to cut $435 million from ARENA's budget, followed by an additional $40 million, but has affirmed its support for the agency.

Operational activities

Investment priorities 
ARENA supports the companies and institutions that are building Australia's future energy system.

ARENA's funding and investment plan lists its three investment priorities and addresses key areas that can help create a smooth transition to renewable energy.

Investment priorities -
 Priority 1. Integrating renewables into the electricity system
 Priority 2. Accelerating hydrogen
 Priority 3. Supporting industry to reduce emissions

Funding programs 
ARENA carries out its mission via the following funding programs:
 Advancing Renewables Program (ARP) - Development, demonstration and pre-commercial deployment projects;
 Research and Development - Renewable energy technologies that will increase commercial deployment within Australia;
 Renewable Energy Venture Capital Fund (REVC) - REVC fosters skills and management capability. It encourages investment in innovative Australian renewable energy companies to strengthen their chance of success;
 Innovation Fund - Emerging Australian technologies & businesses that can accelerate Australia's transition to a renewable energy economy.;

Projects 

ARENA has committed to 486 projects investing $1.46 billion. Some of the projects include: 
Battery storage: Australia's first grid scale batteries in South Australia and Victoria 
Bioenergy and Waste-to-energy: An assessment by the company Licella of the feasibility of constructing its first pre-commercial biofuel plant and James Cook University developing a macroalgae to biofuels project to provide a blueprint for the development and production of high energy algal fuels.
Demand response: A three-year trial of ten pilot demand response projects to curb energy use during extreme peak demand periods, in partnership with AEMO and the NSW Government 
Distributed generation: Australia's first trials of virtual power plants (VPP) 
Electric vehicle: Australia's first fast charging networks for electric vehicles 
Hydrogen fuel: Australia's first renewable hydrogen facilities 
Photovoltaic power station: Australia's first large scale off grid renewable projects including microgrids, solar farms and hybrid projects to power mines and remote communities 
Pumped-storage hydroelectricity: Feasibility studies into pumped hydro projects across Australia including Snowy 2.0, Hydro Tasmania's Battery of the Nation initiatives and a proposed seawater pumped hydro plant at Cultana, South Australia  
Solar photovoltaics: Research which developed techniques for obtaining high photovoltaic performance from poor-quality silicon, and has helped fund utility-scale solar photovoltaic stations in Nyngan, New South Wales (which at 103MW will be the largest solar power station in the southern hemisphere) and Broken Hill, New South Wales.
Solar thermal: Integration of solar-thermal integration with coal-fired power generation at the Kogan Creek Solar Boost Project, a 44MW concentrating solar power plant, projected to be the world's largest solar-coal plant. The agency is also contributing to a feasibility study into local solar thermal power generation in Port Augusta, South Australia and supported a study into the integration of solar thermal power with the National Electricity Market (NEM).
Wave energy A 1MW demonstration generator (by Oceanlinx) for installation off the coast of Port MacDonnell, South Australia. Another is underway in Perth, Western Australia, and in early 2014 it was announced that Lockheed Martin and Ocean Power Technologies would build the world's largest wave energy project (62.5-megawatt) off the southern coast of Australia at Portland, Victoria, partly funded by ARENA.
 Waste-to-energy plant The East Rockingham Waste to Energy and Kwinana Waste to Energy Plant are under construction with financial support from the Australian Renewable Energy Agency.

See also 
 100% renewable energy
 Clean Energy Finance Corporation
 Carbon pricing in Australia
 Distributed energy resources (DER)
 IRENA, the International Renewable Energy Agency
 Renewable Electricity and the Grid
 Anti-nuclear movement in Australia
 Renewable energy in New Zealand

References

External links 
 

Commonwealth Government agencies of Australia
Renewable energy organizations
2012 establishments in Australia
Government agencies established in 2012
Renewable energy in Australia